Miotylopus is an extinct genus of camelid endemic to North America. Fossils have been found in Wyoming and from Nebraska to Southern California.

References

Prehistoric camelids
Prehistoric even-toed ungulate genera
Oligocene even-toed ungulates
Miocene even-toed ungulates
Burdigalian genus extinctions
Cenozoic mammals of North America
Oligocene genus first appearances
Taxa named by Erich Maren Schlaikjer
Fossil taxa described in 1935